Sidney Central School District is a school district in Sidney, New York, United States. The district operates two schools: Sidney Jr. Sr. High School, and Sidney Elementary School.

Administration 
The district offices are located at 95 West Main Street.

Current administrators 
Dr. William Christensen–Superintendent
Mr. Eben Bullock–7-12 Principal
Ms. Kathryn Bailey–Director of Curriculum & Instruction
Mr. Corey Green–Assistant Superintendent for Business
Mr. Chris Haynes–Assistant Principal & Director of Athletics, & Aquatics
Ms. Holly Lape–Coordinator for Special Programs
Mr. Donald Alger–Director of Buildings and Grounds
Ms. Kim Corcoran–Director of School Lunch Program
Mr. Douglas Russell–Director of Transportation

Board of Education 
Ms. Nancy K. Parsons–President
Ms. Tammy Shunk
Ms. Kerri G. Insinga
Ms. Kimberly Ayres
Mr. Robert Holt
Ms. Terri L. Theobald

History

Selected former superintendent 
Mr. Dominic A. Nuciforo Sr.–?-2005

Sidney Jr. Sr. High School 

Sidney Jr. Sr. High School is located at 95 West Main Street and serves grades 7 through 12. The current principal is Mr. Eben Bullock.

History

Selected former principals 
Mr. Timothy J. Turecek–?-2004
Ms. Annette Hammond–2004-2010

Sidney Elementary School 

Sidney Elementary School is located at 15 Pearl Street East and serves grades K through 6. The current principal is Mr. Corey Green.

History

Selected former principals
Mr. Stephen C. Paranya
Mr. Peter Stewart–?-2006

References

External links
Official site

School districts in New York (state)
Education in Delaware County, New York